The N-Joypad is a Famicom clone manufactured by the Hong Kong-based company ABL, which is different from other clones because it does not use cartridges, instead relying on plastic "compact discs" of different size. When the player inserts one of these discs on the system, the disc will trigger a combination of switches on the system which will allow a unique selection of Famicom games to be selected. The system includes a total of 59 games, which are either original games produced in China, or pirate versions of licensed Famicom games which with their music and/or graphics hacked to hide their origin.

Included games
The names of the games as they appear on the selection menu of the system are written in caps followed by the original Famicom title and publisher.

 FUN CLICK - Pokéclick (Union Bond)
 BOX WORLD - Box World (Nice Code)
 MATCHING - Memory Puzzle (Nice Code)
 STRANGE POP POP - Magic Bubble (Nice Code)
 WARRIOR CHASE - Ninja-Kun: Majou No Bouken (Jaleco)
 BURGER BUILD - BurgerTime (Namco)
 RIGHT MOVE - Gomoku Narabe Renju (Nintendo)
 ABACUS - Magic Jewelry (Hwang Shinwei)
 UNDERWORLD - Devil World (Nintendo)
 UFO RACE - F1 Race (Nintendo)
 OBSTACLE RACE - Zippy Race (Irem)
 BASEBALL - Baseball (Nintendo)
 FUTURE COPTER - Battle City (Namco)
 DIAMOND - Diamond (Nice Code)
 TENNIS - Tennis (Nintendo)
 PLANETARY POOL - Lunar Pool (Pony Canyon)
 CLIMBING CLUB - Ice Climber (Nintendo)
 BIRD BRAIN - Bird Week (Toshiba EMI)
 NEED FOR SPEED - Spy Hunter (Sunsoft)
 BUMPITY BOP - Bump 'n' Jump (Data East)
 IN AND OUT RACER - Zippy Race (Irem)
 MONSTER DASH - Brush Roller (Hwang Shinwei)
 STREET FRENZY - City Connection (Jaleco)
 EXTREME RACER - Excitebike (Nintendo)
 CHAMPIONSHIP GOLF - Golf (Nintendo)
 CHAMPIONSHIP WRESTLING - M.U.S.C.L.E. (Bandai)
 JUNGLE TRAIL - Lode Runner (Hudson Soft)
 ARCTIC HUNT - Championship Lode Runner (Hudson Soft)
 AMERICAN FOOTBALL - 10-Yard Fight (Irem)
 ARCHERY - Pooyan (Hudson Soft)
 ZERO GRAVITY - Balloon Fight (Nintendo)
 SUPER ELF - Circus Charlie (Konami)
 GOLD DIGGER - Super Arabian (Sunsoft)
 MARS MAN - Binary Land (Hudson Soft)
 MARS - Star Force (Hudson Soft)
 SPAR - Urban Champion (Nintendo)
 EGG IT - Pac-Man (Namco)
 HELICOPTER HARRY - Raid on Bungeling Bay (Hudson Soft)
 FLY BY - Exerion (Jaleco)
 SNACK ATTACK - Nuts & Milk (Hudson Soft)
 BOMB DROP - Chack'n Pop (Taito)
 DOWN DEEP - Dig Dug (Namco)
 PROPELLER - Sky Destroyer (Taito)
 NEIGHBORHOOD SMASH - Karateka (Soft Pro)
 ENEMY ASSAULT - Choujikuu Yousai Macross (Namco)
 FISH FIGHT - Clu Clu Land (Nintendo)
 WHAT'S UP - Donkey Kong (Nintendo)
 RESCUE - Donkey Kong Jr. (Nintendo)
 FROGLAND - Donkey Kong 3 (Nintendo)
 JUMP AND JOURNEY - Mario Bros. (Nintendo)
 SAUCER WARS - Field Combat (Jaleco)
 DEPTHS OF SPACE - Defender II (HAL Laboratory)
 CONVERT SOLDIER - Formation Z (Jaleco)
 SWIRL - Millipede (HAL Laboratory)
 BREAK OUT - Mappy (Namco)
 SOARING WARRIOR - Joust (HAL Laboratory)
 LET LOOSE - Popeye (Nintendo)
 WARSHIP - Galaxian (Namco)
 VILLAGE PROTECTOR - Space Invaders (Taito)

External links
 Official website of the manufacturer
 7-part video review of the N-Joypad

Unlicensed Nintendo Entertainment System hardware clones